Different gymnastics disciplines have been contested at the Central American and Caribbean Games. Artistic gymnastics has been part of the program since 1946 (except for the 1962 and 1966 editions). Rhythmic gymnastics was first introduced in 1998. Trampoline gymnastics entered the program in 2010.

Editions

All-time medal table

Artistic gymnastics (1946-1959, 1970-2018)

Rhythmic gymnastics (1998-2018)

Trampoline gymnastics (2010-2018)

References

External links
 Los Juegos Regionales Más Antiguos - Juegos Desportivos Centroamericanos y del Caribe

 
CAC Games
Gymnastics